227 is an American sitcom that was created by C.J. Banks and Bill Boulware, and originally aired on NBC. It premiered on September 14, 1985, and ended on May 6, 1990, with a total of 116 episodes over the course of five seasons. The complete first season was released on DVD on September 28, 2004.

Series overview

Episodes

Season 1 (1985–86)

Season 2 (1986–87)

Season 3 (1987–88)

Season 4 (1988–89)

Season 5 (1989–90)

Notes

  A. 'C.J. Banks' is a pseudonym for Michael G. Moye.
  B. 'Bootsie' is a pseudonym for J. Stanford Parker.

References

227